The Peptoniphilaceae are a family of bacteria in the class Clostridia.

Taxonomy
Not validly published genera in Peptoniphilaceae.
 Khoudiadiopia, with the type species K. massiliensis. Proposed in 2017, but not validly published.
 Lagierella, with the type species L. massiliensis. The genus has been proposed twice, in 2016 and 2021, based on the same isolate.
 Micromonas, first proposed in 1981 with the species Micromonas pusilla, but not validly published. Again proposed in 2000 with the new combination Micromonas micros as type species, but ruled illegitimate due to the algal genus Micromonas. M. micros is now validly published as Parvimonas micra.
 Schleiferella, proposed in 2001 as genus for several new combinations, all of which are now validly published in Peptoniphilus.
 Urinacoccus and Urinicoccus, with the type species U. massiliensis. The genus has been proposed twice, in 2016 and 2019, based on the same isolate.

References 

Taxa described in 2014